Pierre de Saurel (1628–1682) was a captain in the Carignan-Salières Regiment and a seigneur who was born in Grenoble and came to New France in 1665.

Captain Saurel was immediately sent to rebuild Fort Richelieu, the fort having been burned by the Iroquois in 1647. The Carignan-Salières Regiment rebuilt the fort on the same site. During Prouville de Tracy's 1666 action against the Mohawks, he and Alexandre Berthier were co-commanders of the rear-guard troops.

In Quebec, the modern-day Sorel-Tracy and the Pierre-De Saurel Regional County Municipality, where Fort Richelieu is located, are named after him.

External links 

 

1628 births
1682 deaths
Military personnel from Grenoble
People of New France